Bhale Mastaru is a 1969 Indian Telugu-language comedy film, produced by C. S. Raju under the Vijayagiri Dhwaja Productions banner and directed by S. D. Lal. It stars N. T. Rama Rao, Anjali Devi and Kanchana, with music composed by T. V. Raju. The film is remake of the Hindi movie Professor (1962).

Plot 
Madhu an unemployed youth lives with his ailing mother who needs hospitalization. Once he views an advertisement for a tutor at the residence of lady Zamindar Sitadevi with handsome pay provided the age is required 50. Ergo, to secure his mother Madhu lands therein, in disguise as Prof. Sonty. Zamindar Sitadevi is a spinster who dictates as the guardian over her deceased brother's 5 progeny Vijaya, Vimala, Buchi Babu, and other 2 infants. Now Madhu takes the charge as their caretaker when this naughty frequently attempts to expel him but to avail. Once Madhu is acquainted with Vijaya as the nephew to Professor, she falls for on him. Parallelly, he also praises Sitadevi in the old to get her credence, when she is attracted and declares to knit him. After a while, Madhu divulges the actuality to Vijaya and she comprehends his virtue. Meanwhile, Vimala is hoodwinked by spiteful Giri and attempts suicide when Madhu shields her as old. Despite the panic, his true form is revealed. Currently, enraged Sitadevi adjudicates him as an impostor and also responsible for Vimala’s state. Hence, she shoots Madhu when he is guarded by his mother and gets wounded. Whereat, Vijaya & the remaining rebuke proclaims her as a demon, which makes Sitadevi collapse. Besides, Vimala recoups via Madhu detects the whereabouts of Giri, and drags him out. At last, flattened Sitadevi is about to quit but Madhu changes her intention and the kids also plead pardon. Finally, the movie ends on a happy note with the marriage of Madhu & Vijaya.

Cast 
N. T. Rama Rao as  Madhu / Prof Sonty
Anjali Devi as Seeta Devi
Kanchana as Vijaya
Krishnam Raju as Giri
Raja Babu as Buchi Babu
Allu Ramalingaiah as Joogulu
Prabhakar Reddy
Mikkilineni
Dr. Sivaramakrishnaiah
Santha Kumari as Madhu's mother
Rama Prabha as Kasulu
Sheela as Vimala

Soundtrack 

Music was composed by T. V. Raju.

References

External links 
 

Indian comedy films
Telugu remakes of Hindi films
Films scored by T. V. Raju
1960s Telugu-language films
1969 comedy films
1969 films
Films directed by S. D. Lal